Bouillé-Loretz is a former commune in the Deux-Sèvres department in the Nouvelle-Aquitaine region in western France. On 1 January 2019, it was merged into the new commune Loretz-d'Argenton.

See also
Communes of the Deux-Sèvres department

References
 Bouillé-Loretz on the Institut géographique national website.

Former communes of Deux-Sèvres